Amba Yaluwo (Sinhala: අඹ යාලුවෝ, English: Best Friends) is a 1957 novel by Sri Lankan author Tikiri Bandara Ilangaratne. The novel has been translated into multiple languages with the English translation by Seneviratne B. Aludeniy published by Sarasavi Publishers in 1998.

A film based on the novel was released in 1990.

Synopsis 
The story focuses on the friendship between two youngsters, Nimal and Sunil (Sudhu Appo), and the socio-economic clashes that surround them. The story begins with Sunil stealing a mango that Nimal had picked up, on which they then fight over. Sunil remorses over his mistake and then he becomes Nimal's friend. Seeing that Nimal's family is struggling a lot, Sunil starts giving food for Nimal's family and their friendship bond becomes stronger. Though, this story is generally considered a children's novel, it provides valuable lessons for everyone in the general society. T.B. Ilangaratne has illustrated even some of the more complex social concerns through this story "Amba Yahaluwo". In this story, both Nimal and Sunil are kept apart because of their places and castes in society; Sunil comes from a higher caste and is forced to keep away from Nimal, whose father is a daily wage worker. But no matter how hard their elders try to keep them apart, the duo finds a way to see each other every day. The duo's fates are shown to be intertwined throughout the story. As an example, the novel opens with Nimal and Sunil sharing a classroom. As the story progresses, and Sunil moves to another region, Sunil's grandmother takes Nimal in as a servant, keeping both lives and stories connected.

References 

Sri Lankan novels
1957 novels